Gordon Williamson Shepherd (September 21, 1897 – December 9, 1978) was an American attorney and politician who served in the Virginia House of Delegates.

References

External links 

1897 births
1978 deaths
Members of the Virginia House of Delegates
20th-century American politicians